The Patternless Delma (Delma inornata) is a small species of legless lizard from the Pygopodidae family, endemic to Australia. This species is commonly found throughout New South Wales (NSW), southeastern South Australia (SA) and southeastern Queensland, inhabiting areas including dry to temperate southern grasslands and grassy woodlands.

Description
The tail is typically 2-4 times the length of the body. The dorsal colouration of this species is grey, grey-brown or olive brown, with scales characterised by a dark outlining border. Ventral scales are a lighter whitish colouration. Juveniles have been observed to have darker scales on top of the head. The absence of a uniform pattern or unique features drove the naming of this species, as these features are often a characterizing trait of Delma species such as Delma impar. Scales are in typically 16 rows but can range from 15-18, with ventral scales being wider than the adjacent body scales, both described as having a smooth surface. This species is further identifiable by three enlarged pre-anal scales and 3-5 scales on the lower hindlimb flap.

Distribution
This species has a relatively wide distribution, spanning across South-eastern Australia. Delma inornata ranges from the region of Darling Downs in south-east Queensland, then extends down south, to the west of the Great Dividing Range in New South Wales to the south-east region of South Australia. There have been records of isolated populations in Northern Queensland and Central Queensland.

Habitat
This species is found to inhabit dry to temperate grasslands, and grassy woodlands in the southern extent of its distribution, whilst it occupies temperate, wetter forests alongside the Great Dividing Range to the north of its distribution range. It is commonly found in the Mallee desert region of Southern Australia, noted to be one of the driest areas of Australia, consisting of highly adapted Native vegetation species with a high diversity of mammals and reptiles. Many specimens have been observed in the Murray-Sunset National Park in the Mallee region of Victoria, lying amongst porcupine grass and saltbush vegetation. This species utilizes low-lying vegetation, fallen logs, and other surface debris for cover and protection from potential predators. Small populations have been observed to inhabit grazing land in south-eastern Australia, where vegetation is often cleared and sparse resulting in increased vulnerability to predators. These populations have adapted to use farming equipment such as water troughs, and metal and wood debris for cover.

Diet
The diet of the Patternless Delma mainly consists of small invertebrates, particularly insects. Species from the Genus Delma are considered to exclusively feed on insects, with a study finding that a Delma inornata specimen had a stomach content analysis showing it contained 76% insect matter. They are found to mainly target surface active insects and spiders.

Feeding Behaviour
Head morphology and jaw structure are the features influencing the feeding mechanisms and behaviour of Delma inornata. A relatively small head tied with the tight jaw bone structure of this species results in a low level of Cranial kinesis, meaning they are unable to attack and ingest larger prey items in comparison to species from the Lialis Genus.

Reproduction
All species from the Genus Delma are defined as oviparous. The majority of species will lay two eggs per clutch, with eggs being parchment-shelled, and elongated. Breeding occurs in the summer season, where ideal temperatures remain consistent.

Taxonomy
This species is part of the Pygopodidae Family, which consists of approximately thirty legless, snake-like species endemic to Australia, with only two species found outside of mainland Australia. These Pygododid lizards are closely related to the Diplodactylidae Family of Geckos. The distinguishing feature is the absence of forelimbs, and replacement of hindlimbs for scaly-flaps, accompanied by snake-like, lidless eyes.

The Genus Delma, created by Gray in 1831, in which this species falls under, currently contains 22 described species. This group of terrestrial legless lizards is characterised by well-developed hindlimb flaps and external ear openings. Headscales are relatively symmetrical and enlarged, with body scales consisting of 20 or fewer rows. Most species in this genus have smooth scales and a tail which is approximately 2-4 times the length of its body.

Gallery

References 

Pygopodids of Australia
Delma
Legless lizards
Taxa named by Arnold G. Kluge
Taxa described in 1974